Louis Spohr's String Quartet No. 11 ("Quatuor brillant") in E major, Op. 43, was completed in May of 1818. It is one of eight similar works Spohr wrote between 1806 and 1835. Like a concerto, the work is designed to display a soloists skills, but in a more intimate setting than the concert hall.

Movements
This quartet is in three movement form:
Allegro
Adagio
Tempo di minuetto: Un poco vivace

References

External links
 Score for the String Quartet No. 11 in E major, Op. 43 at the IMSLP

11
Compositions in E major
1818 compositions